Bigger & Blacker is a television special that premiered on HBO on July 10, 1999, starring comedian Chris Rock. This is Rock's third special for HBO and was recorded at the Apollo Theater in Harlem.

CD version

The CD version was released on July 13, 1999, on the DreamWorks label. The album features the same live stand-up comedy material from the HBO special, but it also includes studio-recorded comic sketches, featuring Ol' Dirty Bastard, Biz Markie, Gerald Levert, Ali LeRoi, Wanda Sykes, Kaz Silver, Horatio Sanz, Ice Cube, Robin Montague, Kali Londono, Don Newkirk, Kate Wright, and Nneka Kai Morton.

Track listing
 Clermont Lounge #1 – 0:55
 "Black Mall" – 3:47
 ODB Words of Wisdom #1 – 0:15
 "Crazy White Kids" – 8:26
 Monica Interview – 1:58
 "Porno PSA" – 1:32
 "No Sex" – 4:22
 "Taxes" – 1:57
 ODB Words of Wisdom #2 – 0:17
 Savion Glover – 1:02
 "Insurance" – 8:17
 Clermont Lounge #2 – 0:58
 Nerd & Fly Girl – 2:58
 "Race" – 4:17
 NYPD – 1:29
 ODB Words of Wisdom #3 – 0:19
 Roger & Zapp – 0:29
 "Two Women" – 4:07
 Table Dance – 2:29
 Snow Flake – 3:10
 "Women" – 7:54
 Me & ODB – 7:09

Reviews

Bigger & Blacker won the 2000 Grammy Award for Best Spoken Comedy Album.

Personnel
Pen & Pixel - Cover art

Sales

References

External links
 

1999 television specials
1999 live albums
1990s American television specials
1990s in comedy
1990s comedy albums
Albums produced by Prince Paul (producer)
Albums recorded at the Apollo Theater
Chris Rock albums
DreamWorks Records live albums
Grammy Award for Best Comedy Album
HBO network specials
Stand-up comedy concert films
Television shows written by Chris Rock